William Rathbone may refer to:

William R. Rathvon (1854–1939), sometimes incorrectly referred to as William V Rathvon or William V Rathbone, eye-witness to Abraham Lincoln's Gettysburg Address
Several members Rathbone family of Liverpool, England:
William Rathbone II (1696–1746), sawyer
William Rathbone III (1726–1789), merchant and ship-owner
William Rathbone IV (1757–1809), merchant and ship-owner
William Rathbone V (1787–1868)
William Rathbone VI (1819–1902), British Liberal Party, Member of Parliament 1880–1895

See also
 – one of at least two ships